Johanne Killi (born 13 October 1997) is a Norwegian freestyle skier who won a bronze medal in slopestyle at Winter X Games and Tinestafetten XX.

References

External links
 
 
 
 
 

1997 births
Living people
People from Dovre
X Games athletes
Norwegian female freestyle skiers
Freestyle skiers at the 2018 Winter Olympics
Freestyle skiers at the 2022 Winter Olympics
Olympic freestyle skiers of Norway
Sportspeople from Innlandet
21st-century Norwegian women